Homework is the second EP released by singer-songwriter Darren Criss. It was released on December 15, 2017. The EP reached No. 7 on Billboard's Independent Albums chart.

Track listing

Charts

References

2017 EPs
Darren Criss EPs